The women's 800 metres event at the 1997 Summer Universiade was held at the Stadio Cibali in Catania, Italy on 26, 27, and 29 August.

Medalists

Results

Heats

Semifinals

Final

References

Athletics at the 1997 Summer Universiade
1997 in women's athletics
1997